The Battle of Nanos took place on Nanos Plateau on 18 April 1942, when 800 Italian soldiers laid siege to 54 Slovene Partisans during World War II. Ten Partisans were killed and eleven captured, while the rest pierced the ring. This was one of the first battles between the Partisan insurgence in the Slovene Littoral, led by Janko Premrl, and the Italian Army, and was the beginning of the struggle for the western border between the two nations.

References

Nanos
Nanos
Slovene Partisans
Nanos
Nanos
Nanos
1942 in Yugoslavia
April 1942 events